The 2011 Western Bulldogs season was the club's 86th since their introduction to the VFL/AFL in 1925. Matthew Boyd was confirmed to be the captain for the season, and Rodney Eade remained as coach.

2011 Results

Pre-season

NAB Cup

NAB Challenge

Home and Away season

Ladder

See also 
 2011 AFL season
 Western Bulldogs season 2010

References

Western Bulldogs seasons
Western Bulldogs